Billabong Band was an Australian television series which aired in 1957 on Melbourne station ABV-2, part of ABC Television. The series aired for four episodes, broadcast on 30 September, 14 October, 4 November, and 18 November. The series was a live program featuring Australian folk songs. The series followed interview series People on the schedule.

The episode broadcast on 4 November 1957 still exists as a kinescope recording, held by the National Archives of Australia. (note: Kinescope recording, also known as telerecording, was an early method of recording live television in the days before video-tape)

References

External links

1957 Australian television series debuts
1957 Australian television series endings
Black-and-white Australian television shows
English-language television shows
Australian Broadcasting Corporation original programming
Australian music television series